Gerald Burns (1940 in Detroit, Michigan – 1997) was an American poet, and artist.

Life
He was educated at Harvard University, Trinity College, Dublin, and taught at Southern Methodist University and New York University. In 1975 Burns moved to Dallas, Texas.  In 1994, he moved to Portland, Oregon. Burns illustrated several of his own books, and designed the covers for Boccherini's Minuet and Prose. In addition to his writing and art, Burns also dabbled in amateur conjuring.

Awards
 1985 NEA Creative Writing Fellowship for poetry
 1992 National Poetry Series Competition, for Shorter Poems

Works
 Laughter in the Gallery (1966)
 Sonnets from the Middle English
 Boccherini's Minuet (1972)
 The Myth of Accidence (c. 1973)
 A Book of Spells (1975)
 Letters to Obscure Men (1979)
 Toward a Phenomenology of Written Art (1979)
 Prose (1982)
 A Thing About Language (1989)
 
 
 Probability, Standing Stone Press
 Fuzzy Dice, Standing Stone Press

Essays

References

External links
Gerald Burns Manuscripts and Other Documents MSS 221. Special Collections & Archives, UC San Diego Library.
"Index of Gerald Burns Stories, Art & Poetry", Dallas Arts Revue
"The Gerald Burns Student Readings," series created by WordSpace Dallas
"Gerald Burns Society"

1940 births
1997 deaths
Harvard University alumni
Southern Methodist University faculty
New York University faculty
Poets from Oregon
Writers from Portland, Oregon
20th-century American poets